William Richard Ernest Healey (22 May 1926 – November 2018) was an English professional footballer who played as a wing half for Fulham and Hartlepool United.

References

1926 births
2018 deaths
Footballers from Liverpool
Association football wing halves
Arsenal F.C. players
Fulham F.C. players
Hartlepool United F.C. players
English footballers